The  Arizona Rattlers season was the 23rd season for the franchise in the Arena Football League, coming off their victory in ArenaBowl XXVI, which was their second consecutive ArenaBowl championship. The team was coached by Kevin Guy and played their home games at the US Airways Center.

Standings

Schedule

Regular season
The Rattlers began the season by hosting the Philadelphia Soul, the team that the Rattlers defeated in ArenaBowl XXVI in the previous season, as well as ArenaBowl XXV in 2012. Their final regular season game was on the road against the Orlando Predators on July 26.

Playoffs

Final roster

References

Arizona Rattlers
Arizona Rattlers seasons
Arizona Rattlers
2010s in Phoenix, Arizona
ArenaBowl champion seasons